Th is a digraph in the Latin script. It was originally introduced into Latin to transliterate Greek loan words. In modern languages that use the Latin alphabet, it represents a number of different sounds. It is the most common digraph in order of frequency in the English language.

Cluster /t.h/

This is not a digraph, since a digraph is a pair of letters representing a single phoneme or a sequence of phonemes that does not correspond to the normal values of the separate characters.

Aspirated stop /tʰ/

The digraph  was first introduced in Latin to transliterate the letter theta  in loans from Greek. Theta was pronounced as an aspirated stop  in Classical and early Koine Greek.

 is used in academic transcription systems to represent letters in south and east Asian alphabets that have the value . According to the Royal Thai General System of Transcription, for example,  represents a series of Thai letters with the value .

 is also used to transcribe the phoneme  in Southern Bantu languages, such as Zulu and Tswana.

Voiceless fricative /θ/

During late antiquity, the Greek phoneme represented by the letter  mutated from an aspirated stop  to a dental fricative .

Later, the digraph reappeared, gradually superseding these letters in Middle English.

Voiced fricative /ð/

English also uses  to represent the voiced dental fricative , as in father. This unusual extension of the digraph to represent a voiced sound is caused by the fact that, in Old English, the sounds  and  stood in allophonic relationship to each other and so did not need to be rigorously distinguished in spelling.

Voiceless retroflex stop /ʈ/

Alveolar stop /t/

Because neither  nor  were native phonemes in Latin, the Greek sound represented by  came to be pronounced . The spelling retained the digraph for etymological reasons. This practice was then borrowed into German, French, Dutch and other languages, where  still appears in originally Greek words, but is pronounced . See German orthography. Interlingua also employs this pronunciation.

In early modern times, French, German and English all expanded this by analogy to words for which there is no etymological reason, but for the most part the modern spelling systems have eliminated this.

In English,  for  can also occur in loan-words from French or German, such as Neanderthal. The English name Thomas has initial  because it was loaned from Norman.

Dental stop /t̪/

In the transcription of Australian Aboriginal languages  represents a dental stop, .

/h/

In most cases word-initially, it is pronounced . For example: Irish and Scottish Gaelic   'will' →   'your will'.

Lenition in Gaelic lettering was traditionally denoted in handwriting using an overdot but typesetters lacked these pre-composed types and substituted a trailing . This is an example of "inverted (historical) spelling": the model of words where the original interdental fricative had disappeared between vowels caused  to be reinterpreted as a marker of hiatus.

Ø

The Irish and Scottish Gaelic lenited  is silent in final position, as in Scottish Gaelic   'tired'. And, rarely, it is silent in initial position, as in Scottish Gaelic   'you'.

ᵺ

 is used for phonetic notation in some dictionaries.

See also

Pronunciation of English ⟨th⟩

Footnotes

English th
Latin-script digraphs
Graphemes